The Centennial Park District, formerly the Luckie-Marietta District, is a district of Downtown Atlanta named after the walkable neighborhood and entertainment district that surround  Centennial Olympic Park. The district was originally created in 2007 by Legacy Properties, in support of their redevelopment projects in the district. However, "Luckie Marietta" was used by a wide range of Atlanta media to refer to the district. The district was rebranded the Centennial Park District and is now under the management of Central Atlanta Progress.

The area was mostly one of industrial and warehouse use (see map) and was in decline after the mid-20th century, even after Centennial Olympic Park was built for the 1996 Olympics.

Developer Legacy's stated goals were to create a district within Downtown Atlanta that would contain entertainment, hotel accommodations and restaurants all within walking distance of each other and of the nearby Mercedes-Benz Stadium, Philips Arena, Georgia World Congress Center, CNN Center, World of Coca-Cola and Georgia Aquarium. It would lure visitors to stay, dine, and be entertained near those facilities and attractions instead of in the Peachtree Center area of Downtown or even Buckhead. Whereas a few years prior, few facilities existed in the area, by 2011, the district counted 25 restaurants and 6 hotels, the Ventana events center and a helipad. The area is set to add the College Football Hall of Fame and Times Square South to its roster of attractions. 

Currently the District is home to a variety of attractions, restaurants and lounges, event spaces, hotels, and office and retail spaces.

College Football Hall of Fame
The College Football Hall of Fame moved to a new facility on the southwest side of Marietta Street, between Foundry and Baker Streets, and opened in 2014.

Times Square South
In October 2011, Legacy Properties announced plans to build Times Square South at 285 Marietta, at the corner of Baker and Marietta streets. Characteristic of New York City's Times Square, a portion of the facade will be in the form of a dynamic video wall along two sides of a new multi-use building. Times Square South will sit across the street from the College Football Hall of Fame.

Geography
The Centennial Park District defines its boundaries with Centennial Olympic Park as the center and all properties within 1-2 blocks of the park. The Mercedes-Benz Stadium, Philips Arena and Georgia World Congress Center are included because of their proximity.

References

External links
  Centennial Park District site
 Times Square South at 285 Marietta

Neighborhoods in Atlanta